Ministry of Religious Affairs and Public Education can refer to:
 Ministry of Religious Affairs and Public Education (Poland)
 Ministry of Religious Affairs and Public Education (Russia)